Fabriciana nerippe is an East Palearctic butterfly in the family Nymphalidae (Heliconiinae). 
It is found in Japan, Korea, China, and Tibet.

Subspecies
Listed chronologically:
F. n. nerippe – Japan
F. n. coreana (Butler, 1882) (often treated as a distinct species) – Amur, Ussuri, China, Korea, Japan
F. n. nerippina (Fruhstorfer, 1907) – Tibet
F. n. mumon (Matsumura, 1929) – Ussuri

References

Fabriciana
Butterflies described in 1862